The 20th People's Choice Awards, honoring the best in popular culture for 1993, were held on March 8, 1994, at Universal Studios Hollywood, in Universal City, California. They were hosted by Paul Reiser, and broadcast on CBS.

Steven Spielberg received a special award for his work in the motion picture industry.

Awards
Winners are listed first, in bold.

References

External links
1994 People's Choice.com

People's Choice Awards
1994 awards in the United States
1994 in California
March 1994 events in the United States